Aristoc, located in Belper in Derbyshire, is a British marketer and manufacturer of hosiery.

Aristoc was first registered as a trademark in 1924 by A.E. Allen and Co. Ltd; appearing in advertising for the company from 1926. In 1934 the company was renamed Aristoc. Today the company makes most of its products in the Amber Valley in Derbyshire.

About
Aristoc is a British hosiery brand that is over 80 years old. Albert Ernest Allen founded the company A. E. Allen and Co. Ltd. in 1919 which was renamed 'Aristoc' in 1934. Aristoc originally marketed itself as the "aristocrat of silk stockings". They are famous for their production of tights, knee-highs, stockings, shapewears, and body shapers. Aristoc is a brand under the company Pretty Polly. They are known to be reasonably priced so most can afford them. Aristoc is most commonly known for their body shapers. Aristoc is recorded to be one of the longest established hosiery brands in the United Kingdom. As of 2013, Aristoc has stated that 90% of its manufacturing is currently based in Britain, at its Derbyshire facility, as part of its campaign to support traditional British manufacturing.

References

Further reading
 Bramwell G Rudd, COURTAULDS and the HOSIERY & KNITWEAR INDUSTRY, (Carnegie Publishing Ltd) (2014, ISBN softback 978-1-905472-06-2, hardback 978-1-905472-18-5)

External links
 Official website

Clothing companies of the United Kingdom
Hosiery brands
Clothing companies established in 1924
Companies based in Nottinghamshire
1924 establishments in England
English brands